Audiovision was a Swedish metal band.

Audiovision may also refer to:

Audio description, descriptive video, narration added to films for the sight-impaired
Audiovision, simultaneous use of separate audio and visual media in distance learning
Audiovisión, a 2010 album by the Chilean singer-songwriter Gepe
Audio-Visions, a 1980 album by American progressive rock band Kansas
Audio Visions, XM Satellite Radio channel
Apple AudioVision 14 Display
AudioVision CD